Andrea Caldarelli (born 14 February 1990 in Pescara) is an Italian racing driver. He has competed in such series as Eurocup Formula Renault 2.0, the Formula Three Euroseries, GP2 Asia, the GP3 Series and the Super Formula series.

He undertook a Formula One test in 2008 with Toyota Racing and in 2010 with Ferrari.

Career

Super GT
Caldarelli claimed his maiden victory in Super GT in 2014. Driving alongside Daisuke Itō for Lexus Team KeePer TOM'S, Caldarelli claimed victory in the opening race of the season at Okayama. The duo would finish the season second in the GT500-class championship to Tsugio Matsuda and Ronnie Quintarelli.

Lamborghini factory driver
Ahead of the 2017 Blancpain GT Series campaign, Caldarelli joined Lamborghini Squadra Corse's factory roster, taking part in the Blancpain GT Series Endurance Cup campaign with GRT Grasser Racing Team. Partnering with Christian Engelhart and Mirko Bortolotti, the trio claimed the series championship at season's end. Two years later, Caldarelli swept all three of the championships under the GT World Challenge Europe umbrella; the Endurance Cup, Sprint Cup, and combined championship at large.

For the 2021 season, Caldarelli began competing in the United States, taking part in K-Pax Racing's return to the GT World Challenge America. Paired with Jordan Pepper, Caldarelli would claim nine overall victories in 13 races, taking the series championship two races early. He returned to the team the following year, successfully defending his title during the 2022 season. In 2023, Caldarelli returned to the GT World Challenge Europe Endurance Cup, taking part with Iron Lynx alongside co-drivers Bortolotti and Pepper.

In July 2022, Caldarelli was named as one of the first drivers slated to compete in Lamborghini's LMDh entry, set to debut in 2024.

Racing record

Complete GP2 Series results

Complete GP2 Asia Series results
(key) (Races in bold indicate pole position) (Races in italics indicate fastest lap)

Complete GP3 Series results
(key) (Races in bold indicate pole position) (Races in italics indicate fastest lap)

Complete Formula Nippon/Super Formula Results
(Races in bold indicate pole position)

Complete Super GT results

Complete Blancpain GT World Challenge Europe results

Complete IMSA SportsCar Championship results
(key) (Races in bold indicate pole position; races in italics indicate fastest lap)

* Season still in progress.

Complete British GT Championship results
(key) (Races in bold indicate pole position in class) (Races in italics indicate fastest lap in class)

Complete FIA World Endurance Championship results 
(key) (Races in bold indicate pole position) (Races in italics indicate fastest lap)

* Season still in progress.

References

External links

 Official website
 Career statistics from Driver Database

1990 births
Living people
Sportspeople from Pescara
Italian racing drivers
Italian Formula Renault 2.0 drivers
Asian Formula Renault Challenge drivers
Formula Renault Eurocup drivers
Formula Renault 2.0 WEC drivers
Formula 3 Euro Series drivers
Italian Formula Three Championship drivers
GP2 Asia Series drivers
Italian GP3 Series drivers
Formula Nippon drivers
FIA Institute Young Driver Excellence Academy drivers
Super GT drivers
Super Formula drivers
International GT Open drivers
WeatherTech SportsCar Championship drivers
24 Hours of Daytona drivers
British GT Championship drivers
Prema Powerteam drivers
GT World Challenge America drivers
Ocean Racing Technology drivers
Tech 1 Racing drivers
Kondō Racing drivers
TOM'S drivers
Team LeMans drivers
Sports car racing team owners
SG Formula drivers
Lamborghini Squadra Corse drivers
24H Series drivers
Le Mans Cup drivers
Iron Lynx drivers
FIA World Endurance Championship drivers